The Dressmaker is a Gothic novel written by the Australian author Rosalie Ham, and is Ham's debut novel. It was first published by Duffy & Snellgrove on January 1, 2000. The story is set in a 1950s fictional Australian country town, Dungatar, and explores love, hate and haute couture.

The novel is divided into four sections, each named after a different fabric and representing different phases in the story: gingham, shantung, felt and brocade. Since its release the novel has sold over 75,000 copies and has been translated into a number of languages including German and French.

A film adaptation of the book was released on October 29, 2015, with Kate Winslet as the protagonist Tilly Dunnage. A special film tie-in edition of the novel, featuring a new book cover with Winslet as the titular character, was released worldwide from August to October 2015. The tie-in-edition of the book sold 90,000 hard copies and 20,000 ebooks.

Background and setting
The novel is Rosalie Ham's first published novel, and was picked up for publication within a year after Ham finished writing it. She sent the manuscript to four publishers and received rejections but on one of the readers' advice she sent her manuscript to Duffy & Snellgrove, who picked it up for publication. According to Ham, the novel is a product of serendipity. In 1996, she enrolled in the writing programme of RMIT University but on her arrival she found that it was already full. As she was leaving, novelist Antoni Jach advised her to take a novel course instead. In novel-writing class, she got an assignment of "a 500-word synopsis of her book", which she recalled as "I had an idea and started writing it. Then you had to hand in 3,000 words, and then you had to hand in 10,000 words, and I had 30,000 words. It was only three weeks before I realised that this was the best 'accident' that had ever occurred to me."

The novel is set in a small country town of Australia. Ham, who herself was born and raised in the southern New South Wales town of Jerilderie, said that she was inspired by the fact everyone knows everything about each other and "(her) mother was a dressmaker in a small country town, and the idiosyncrasies of those two factors were the seed for the story". But she clarified that she did not intentionally use a country town based on her own experiences as she explained that "My experience in my home town was the absolute contrary (to Dungatar)."

Plot
In the 1950s, Myrtle "Tilly" Dunnage returns to her hometown of Dungatar, an Australian country town, to take care of her ill mother, Molly. The people of Dungatar sent Tilly away at the age of ten because of false accusations of murder, after the death of fellow student Stewart Pettyman.

Tilly, an expert dressmaker trained by Madeleine Vionnet in Paris, starts a dressmaking business and transforms the locals with her couture creations. Many of the townsfolk who revile her nevertheless arrange for her to make them couture outfits. Sergeant Farrat, the town's policeman with an eye for beautiful fashion, liaises with Tilly in exchange for dressmaking assistance and design advice. Ted, the eldest son of the town's poor family, begins to pursue Tilly, and tries to assist her in standing up to the vicious gossip and small-minded attitudes of the townsfolk.

Most of the women in town arrange for Tilly to create individual gowns for the town dance. She also makes her own frock, but when she and Teddy, the town's heartthrob, arrive at the dance, her name has been removed from all the tables in the hall, and one of the townsfolk blocks the door to stop her coming in. Teddy finds her crying outside, and takes her back to his ramshackle caravan. There, he helps her remember the 'murder' she doesn't remember committing: as a bastard child, she was teased and bullied unmercifully by the rest of the town children. One day Stewart Pettyman, the abusive and physical bully, cornered her and charged at her, head-down like a bull, intending to wind her and probably injure her severely. Instead, she stood aside at the last moment, and Stewart hit the wall head on at a run and broke his neck. Sergeant Farrat arranged for her to go to a Melbourne boarding school, where she began her dressmaking education.

Tilly and Teddy make love, then, later on top of a silo, he tells her of the fun he had as a boy, jumping into the town's wheat bins. He then proceeds to do it, despite Tilly's warning cries. The silo holds sorghum instead of wheat, and Teddy suffocates as he sinks into the grain.

Tilly remains in town, and as the townsfolk blame her for Ted's death and abandon her again, she begins making clothing for the neighbouring towns' women. A town-based rivalry begins. Then Molly Dunnage dies. Shortly afterwards, one of the town's meanest gossips is critically injured while she is snooping, and the town's chemist drowns. Both of these deaths are accidents. Tilly proceeds to tell the town councilman's wife, Marigold Pettyman, the truth about Tilly's heritage and Stewart's death, that Councilman Evan Pettyman is Tilly's father and he has also been drugging Marigold and assaulting her at night. Marigold then murders her husband and attempts to commit suicide using the same drug her husband used on her.

The sergeant is horrified when a District Inspector comes to investigate the sudden surge of deaths. Tilly, while fitting one of the women from the neighbouring town, hears of an upcoming Eisteddfod and suggests that drama should be included. The local townsfolk come to her to make the costumes for their version of Macbeth, which they do not know and want to have staged in Baroque costumes. Tilly refuses to do so unless she is paid for past work and upfront for the costumes. The money is taken from funds which should have been sent off to insure the town's buildings. Tilly makes all the costumes, and watches as the entire town departs to either participate or watch the performance. She then covers the town in petrol and sets her house on fire, taking only her sewing machine, Tilly leaves by train, leaving the burnt town for the locals to discover after the show.

Characters
Myrtle "Tilly" Dunnage : Protagonist of the novel; after leaving Dungatar, she worked in the fashion industry throughout Europe and on her return becomes the new popular dressmaker of the town.
Molly Dunnage : Tilly's mother; she is mentally unstable and also called "Mad Molly" by the townspeople.
Ted McSwiney : Love interest of Tilly and star footballer of the town.
Sergeant Horatio Farrat : Town's only police officer and a secret crossdresser.
Gertrude "Trudy" Pratt : A nice young girl who, after her marriage, becomes part of the circle of nasty women in town and starts controlling and manipulating her husband.
William Beaumont : Husband of Trudy and son of Elsbeth, who returns to Dungatar after attending agricultural college in Armidale. In an attempt to rebel against his controlling mother, he marries Trudy and later realises that he does not love her. 
Elsbeth Beaumont : A controlling and snobbish old woman, who lives outside of Dungatar at the farm.
Mona Beaumont : Second child of Elsbeth and sister of William. 
Lesley Muncan : Initially a visitor to town but, due to a misunderstanding, reluctantly marries Mona Beaumont. 
Evan Pettyman : Councillor of the town and father of Tilly from his secret affair with Molly; he is later murdered by his wife when she finds out about the affair.
Marigold Pettyman : Wife of Evan; she has cleaning OCD and is depressed over the death of her only son.
Stewart Pettyman : Son of Evan and Marigold; he died when he was a child in a tragic accident.
Muriel Pratt : Mother of Trudy and wife of Alvin; she owns a store in town with her husband and is part of the snobby women of town.
Alvin Pratt : Father of Trudy and husband of Muriel; owns a grocery store in town with his wife.
Percival Almanac : An orthodox, controlling and violent man who looks down on others; he owns the town pharmacy and makes his own medicines.
Irma Almanac : Wife of Percival; she is suffering from some disease but her husband, with his controlling temper, does not let her get proper medication as he believes that her pain is the result of sin. 
Edward McSwiney : Father of Teddy and town's handyman; he and his family are considered outcasts and live at the edge of town.
Mae McSwiney : Wife of Edward and mother of eleven children including Teddy and Barney; she often checks on Molly in the absence of Tilly from the town.
Barney McSwiney : Brother of Teddy; has some kind of disability. 
Faith O’Brien : Lead singer of the town's local band; married to Hamish O’Brien but having an affair with Reginald Blood, which she does not hide at all but still her husband is unaware of it.
Hamish O’Brien : Husband of Faith; he is in the local band and also works as a conductor for the trains coming in and out of Dungatar. 
Reginald Blood : Town's local butcher; he is having an affair with married Faith O'Brien and keeps the townspeople silent about his affair by bribing them.
Prudence Dimm : Tilly's former schoolteacher; teaches at school in Dungatar.
Ruth Dimm : Works at the post office and is in a secret relationship with Nancy Pickett.
Nancy Pickett : A strong woman; she is in a secret relationship with Ruth.
Bobby Pickett : Brother of Nancy; he is gentle and slow because of which he was picked on by other students in school.
Lois Pickett : Mother of Nancy and Bobby; famous for picking her own scabs and blackheads.
Purl Bundle : She works at the town's local hotel and is described as very beautiful.
Fred Bundle : Husband of Purl. Owns the town's local pub. 
Septimus Crescent : One of the townsmen; he always has pub spats with Hamish O’Brien and despite knowing that Hamish's wife is having an affair with Reginald Blood, he never reveals that to him.
Beula Harridene : Town's malicious snoop.
Una Pleasance : Tilly's rival dressmaker; hired by the townswomen.

Themes

The novel probes the human emotions and behaviours and how hypocrisy, bigotry, prejudice, vanity and malice alter people's perspective and make unacceptable things acceptable and vice versa.

In a review for the Trinity College Foundation Studies Literature paper "Steep Stairs Review Collected and Neglected Works", Neralie Hoadley notes how "[the novel] is gothic in the sense of being extreme in its depictions of events in the overstated manner associated with tragedy. Love is central to the intensity of feeling that drives the main narrative line, though only covered with the utmost brevity and obliqueness. Hate is essential in any good tragedy, and as this novel deals with the base motivation of revenge, hate is present in abundance. Haute couture provides Rosalie Ham with a satirical voice to lampoon rural sensibilities." Hoadley also compares the climax of the novel with Shakespearean tragedy Macbeth, referring towards the fate of characters and also the play of Macbeth that Dungatar's people participate in.

In an interview Ham describes the most common traits she found annoying in humans and similarly these traits are incorporated in her characters, "three of the things I find MOST annoying about humans (suspicion, malice and prejudice) but it's rife among all of us."

Reception

Critical response
Daneet Steffens of The Boston Globe in her review called it "Blunt, raw and more than a little fantastical, the novel exposes both the dark and the shimmering lights in our human hearts." In a review for New South Wales Writers' Centre, Sophia Barnes gave the novel a positive review and praising Ham, wrote that "Ham has a wonderful sense of the absurdities of human character and the extremes of human behaviour, even in the humdrum domestic lives of a small town." The Australian praised Ham's writing by saying that "Rosalie Ham’s The Dressmaker was one of those rare first novels that arrived virtually unannounced…and gathered momentum largely by word of mouth to become a bestseller and book club favourite. Ham writes delightfully rich set pieces and descriptive passages… Ham’s eye for the absurd, the comical and the poignant are highly tuned. It is a first novel to be proud of, and definitely one to savour and enjoy." The Sydney Morning Herald called it "a feral version of Sea Change." The Age also appreciated Ham's writing by saying that "Ham does show herself a writer with strong visual gifts and a pleasingly sour sense of humour." Another reviewer said in his review that "The Dressmaker is a delightful first novel that is at times laugh-out-loud amusing and which beautifully captures the narrow, small-minded bigotry of rural townships."

Accolades
In 2001, the novel was short-listed for Christina Stead Prize for Fiction at New South Wales Premier's Literary Awards and was nominated for Vision Australia’s Braille Book of the Year and Booksellers Association Book of the Year Award. In 2007, it was the finalist at State Library of Victoria's Most Popular Novel. The book also made the Victorian Certificate of Education reading list three times.

Tie-in-edition with film

A new edition of the book with the cover featuring Kate Winslet as Myrtle "Tilly" Dunnage was released by Penguin Books on August 11, 2015 in USA, Canada, and by Macmillan Publishers in Australia in September, 2015. In the UK, it was published by Serpent's Tail on October 22, 2015.

On July 30, 2015, Ham appeared at the Melbourne International Film Festival's event Books at MIFF to discuss the book's transition into film, along with Sue Maslin, Jocelyn Moorhouse and original publisher of the book Michael Duffy, who revealed that the book will be published in 16 new territories. Duffy even hired a production person and a publicist (as the original publisher Duffy & Snellgrove had shut down their production in 2005) to handle the release of 25,000 copies of the novel, describing it as "the biggest print run we've ever done".

Ham promoted the book, first at a lecture arranged by The Ewing Trust at Yarra libraries titled The Dressmaker from Page to Screen on August 6, 2015. Next she appeared at the literary lunch for the discussion of the transformation of the book to screen, which took place at Fowles Wine on August 23, 2015.

Film adaptations

Ham originally sold the rights of the novel in the mid-2000s and wrote the screenplay for the film herself but the project was shelved. Sue Maslin, along with Film Art Media, acquired the rights to the novel for the film adaptation in 2009 and brought Jocelyn Moorhouse on board as director. Moorhouse also adapted a screenplay from Ham's novel. Universal Pictures acquired the distribution rights of the film in Australia and New Zealand.

In August 2013, it was announced that Kate Winslet and Judy Davis had joined the cast of the film as Myrtle "Tilly" and Molly Dunnage respectively. Liam Hemsworth as Teddy McSwiney along with Isla Fisher as Gertrude Pratt and Elizabeth Debicki as Una joined the cast in early May 2014, but later Fisher and Debicki dropped out and were replaced by Sarah Snook and Sacha Horler respectively. In October 2014, Hugo Weaving joined the cast as Sergeant Farrat along with Caroline Goodall, Shane Bourne, Kerry Fox, Rebecca Gibney, Shane Jacobson, Alison Whyte and Genevieve Lemon.

Principal photography began from October 17, 2014, in Melbourne, Australia at Docklands Studios and continued all over Victoria, Australia and was finished on December 13, 2014. It was released on October 29, 2015 in Australia.

References

External links
 The Dressmaker on Google Books
 Rosalie Ham's official website

2000 Australian novels
Australian novels adapted into films
Novels about revenge
Australian Gothic novels
Duffy & Snellgrove books
2000 debut novels